The Carpenter Hotel Historic District comprises a hotel complex near Atlantic City, Wyoming. Also known as the Miner's Delight Inn, the hotel was established by Nellie Carpenter in 1904 with six rooms and a dining room. The hotel was expanded in 1935 with a two-story section and five guest cabins. The hotel housed Atlantic City's post office from 1930 to 1953. The Carpenter family sold the hotel in 1963 following Nellie's death. It continues to operate as a hotel.

The Carpenter Hotel was listed on the National Register of Historic Places on September 29, 1982.

References

External links
 http://www.minersdelightinn.com/ Miners Delight Inn] website
 Carpenter Hotel Historic District at the Wyoming State Historic Preservation Office

National Register of Historic Places in Fremont County, Wyoming
Historic districts on the National Register of Historic Places in Wyoming
Hotels in Wyoming